Pietro is an Italian masculine given name. Notable people with the name include:

People
 Pietro I Candiano (c. 842–887), briefly the 16th Doge of Venice
 Pietro Tribuno (died 912), 17th Doge of Venice, from 887 to his death
 Pietro II Candiano (c. 872–939), 19th Doge of Venice, son of Pietro I

A–E
 Pietro Accolti (1455–1532), Italian Roman Catholic cardinal
 Pietro Aldobrandini (1571–1621), Italian cardinal and patron of the arts
 Pietro Anastasi (1948–2020), Italian former footballer
 Pietro di Antonio Dei, birth name of Bartolomeo della Gatta (1448–1502), Florentine painter, illuminator and architect
 Pietro Aretino (1492–1556), Italian author, playwright, poet, satirist and blackmailer
 Pietro Auletta (1698–1771), Italian composer known mainly for his operas
 Pietro Baracchi (1851–1926), Italian-born astronomer
 Pietro Bellotti (1625–1700), Italian Baroque painter
 Pietro Belluschi (1899–1994), Italian architect
 Pietro Bembo (1470–1547), Italian scholar, poet, literary theorist, member of the Knights Hospitaller and cardinal
 Pietro Bernini (1562–1629), Italian sculptor
 Pietro Borghese (1398–1484), also called Pietro della Francesca, Italian painter of the early Renaissance
 Pietro Bianchi (disambiguation)
 Pietro Campilli (1891–1974), Italian economist and politician
 Pietro Carnesecchi (1508–1567), Italian humanist
 Pietro Cascella (1921–2008), Italian painter and sculptor
 Pietro Cataldi (1548–1626), Italian mathematician
 Pietro Crinito (1475–1507), known as Crinitus or Pietro Del Riccio Baldi, Florentine humanist scholar and poet
 Pietro Dusina, Italian priest and inquisitor
 Pietro Erardi (1644–1727), Maltese chaplain and painter

F–M
 Pietro Facchetti (1539–1613), Italian painter of the late Renaissance
 Pietro Ferrari (footballer, born 1906), Italian retired footballer
 Pietro Ferraris (1912–1991), Italian footballer
 Pietro Ferrero (disambiguation)
 Pietro Fontana (engraver) (1762–1837), Italian engraver
 Pietro Fontana (engineer), early 19th century Italian engineer and agronomist
 Pietro Germi (1914–1974), Italian actor, screenwriter and director
 Pietro Lanza di Scalea (1863–1938), Italian noble and politician
 Pietro Locatelli (1695–1764), Italian Baroque composer and violinist
 Pietro Lombardi (architect) (1894–1984), Italian architect
 Pietro Lombardi (wrestler) (1922–2011), Italian wrestler
 Pietro Lombardi (singer) (born 1992), German singer
 Pietro Loredan (1372–1438), Venetian nobleman and military commander on sea and land
 Pietro Antonio Lorenzoni (1721–1782), Austrian painter
 Pietro Magni (sculptor) (1817–1877), Italian sculptor
 Pietro Magni (engineer) (1898–1988), Italian aeronautical engineer
 Pietro Magni (footballer) (1919–1992), Italian footballer and football manager
 Pietro Melchiorre Ferrari (1735–1787), painter from Parma
 Pietro Mennea (1952–2013), Italian sprinter and politician
 Pietro Metastasio, pseudonym of Pietro Antonio Domenico Trapassi (1698–1782), Italian poet and librettist

N–Z
 Pietro Negroni (c. 1505–1565), Italian painter of the Renaissance
 Pietro Pastore (1908–1969), Italian footballer and actor
 Pietro Pedranzini (1826-1903), Italian Lieutenant
 Pietro Perti or Peretti (1648–1714), Italian Baroque sculptor and architect
 Peter S. Pezzati (1902–1993), aka Pietro Pezzati, American portrait painter
 Pietro Pezzati (artist) (1828–1898), Italian mural painter
 Pietro Porcinai (1910–1986), Italian landscape architect
 Pietro Scalia (born 1960), Italian-American film editor
 Pietro Scarcella (born 1950), Italian-Canadian mobster
 Pietro Antonio Solari (c. 1445–1493), Italian architect and sculptor
 Pietro or Pier Paolo Vergerio (c. 1498–1565), Italian religious reformer
 Pietro De Vico (1911–1999), Italian film actor
 Pietro Vierchowod (born 1959), Italian football manager and former player
 Pietro Vinci (c. 1525–1584), Italian composer
 Pietro Ziani (died 1230), 42nd Doge of Venice

Fictional characters
 Pietro Maximoff, fictional Marvel Comics superhero known as Quicksilver

See also
 San Pietro (disambiguation)
 Peter (given name)
 Pietra (disambiguation)

Italian masculine given names